John William Bell (March 18, 1838 – July 5, 1901) was a farmer and Ontario political figure. He representing Addington in the House of Commons of Canada as a Conservative member from 1882 to 1891 and from 1896 to 1901.

He was born in Camden Township in Upper Canada in 1838. He obtained a teaching certificate and taught for a number of years and then began farming. He continued to teach religious school and hold a weekly Bible class for the local Methodist church. Bell served as reeve in the township and, in 1879, served as warden for Lennox and Addington counties. In 1889, he supported a motion by William Edward O'Brien which opposed the Jesuits' Estates Act. This legislation was opposed by the Orange Order, of which Bell was a member, because the pope would be involved in resolving the disposition of these properties in Quebec. Bell also opposed legislation restoring school rights for Roman Catholics in Manitoba. In 1900, Bell was elected president of the World Council in New York City for the Orange Order.

He died on his farm in Camden Township in 1901 while still in office as an MP.

External links
Biography at the Dictionary of Canadian Biography Online
 

1838 births
1901 deaths
Conservative Party of Canada (1867–1942) MPs
Members of the House of Commons of Canada from Ontario